Vyacheslav Borisovich Lugovkin (born 13 February 1968) is a Russian professional football coach and a former player. He is the manager of FC Znamya Truda Orekhovo-Zuyevo.

Club career
He made his professional debut in the Soviet Second League in 1985 for FC Saturn Andropov.

Honours
 Soviet Cup winner: 1991 (played for the main squad of PFC CSKA Moscow in the tournament).

References

1968 births
People from Rybinsk
Living people
Soviet footballers
Russian footballers
Association football midfielders
PFC CSKA Moscow players
FC Shinnik Yaroslavl players
FC Rostov players
FC Tyumen players
FC Arsenal Tula players
FC Volgar Astrakhan players
Russian Premier League players
Russian football managers
FC Znamya Truda Orekhovo-Zuyevo managers
Sportspeople from Yaroslavl Oblast